The Vjosa-Narta Protected Landscape is a protected landscape area in southwestern Albania. The International Union for Conservation of Nature  (IUCN) has listed the park as Category VI. It is also listed as an important Bird and Plant Area, because it supports significant bird and plant species.

Vjosa is considered to be Europe's last wild river and originates within the Pindus Mountains close to the border between Albania and Greece. North of the Narta Lagoon is a watershed, whence the river drains into the Adriatic Sea. The shallow lagoon of Narta is separated from the Adriatic Sea by narrow sandy bar, which is covered with pine forests. At the same time it is also connected through two artificial channels with the sea. Located in the direct proximity to the Adriatic Sea, the landscape experiences mediterranean climate. This means that the winters are mild and the summers are hot and dry. The mediterranean character is marked by the annual distribution of precipitation, high in the winter months and moderate in the summer months.

The landscape is part of a large preserved ecosystem collectively composed of various kinds of habitats, including pine and riverine forests, freshwater wetlands, salt marshlands, shrubs and sandy dunes. Despite occupying a relatively small area, 1400 vascular plant species have been observed in the landscape. Forest makes up approximately 6 percent of the total land area. It is dominated by pine with species such as aleppo pine, maritime pine and stone pine, while the islands are mainly covered with mediterranean cypress, holm oak and downy oak. Salt marshes are widely distributed around the coastline of the lagoon. Most notable plant communities amongst them are the Salicornia', Arthrocaulon and Limonium''. The sandy dunes along the coast may reach up to 8 metres.

The wealth of fauna is reflected in the list of 741 species and subspecies recorded to date, composed by 32 species of mammals, 194 species of birds, 26 species of reptiles, 9 species of amphibia, 90 species of fish, 390 species of invertebrates and several other species. Although, the landscape shelters 26 globally threatened species. Most important wildlife inhabiting the landscape include the flamingo, dalmatian pelican, golden jackal and dolphin. Its rich number of birds is attributed to the three different types of water habitats it contains brackish, fresh and salt water. Most of the bird species have at least 6% of their total national population in the territory of the landscape.

See also 
 Geography of Albania
 Protected areas of Albania   
 Vjosë River & Narta Lagoon
 Vlora International Airport

References

External links 

 

Tourist attractions in Albania
Geography of Vlorë County
Tourist attractions in Vlorë County
Important Bird Areas of Albania
Albanian Adriatic Sea Coast
Protected landscapes in Albania